Bogojević is a Serbian surname. It derives from personal name Bogoje (Богоје), derived from the word bog meaning "God", with the possessive suffix -ev (Bogoje's). The suffix ić is a diminutive designation, or descendant designation. Thus the last name can be translated as Bogoje's son. It may refer to:

People
Vladimir Bogojević, Serbian basketball player
Milovan Bogojević, Serbian former basketball player and coach
Bratislav Bogojević, Serbian former football player and manager
Stanko Bogojević, Serbian former football player
Drago Bogojević, Bosnian Serb former football player
Ljiljana Bogojević, Croatian actress
Radojko Bogojević, Serbian ambassador
Nenad Bogojević "Bogi", Serbian guitarist
Slavoljub Slava Bogojević, Serbian artist
L. Bogojević, Serbian author
Mirko Bogojević aka "Das Bo", German hip-hop artist part of Fünf Sterne deluxe-group
Mirjana Bogojevic, Miss Germany 2001
Andreas Bogojevic, Canadian politician
Nikola Bogojevic, American professional wrestler

Placenames
Bogojević Selo, in Trebinje municipality, Bosnia and Herzegovina
Bogojevići, in Arilje municipality, Serbia
Staniseljici -Bogojević selo, in Ljesanska Nahija, Montenegro

See also 
Borojević

Serbian surnames